Baron Dániel Bánffy de Losoncz (18 September 1893 – 7 April 1955) was a Hungarian politician, who served as Minister of Agriculture between 1940 and 1944. His grandfather was Baron Dezső Bánffy, who functioned as Speaker of the House of Representatives and Prime Minister.

He farmed in his possessions in Transylvania from 1917 until 1940. In August 1940, the second Vienna Award granted Northern Transylvania to Hungary. Bánffy became a member of the House of Representatives of Hungary as leader of the Transylvanian Party. He served as agriculture minister in the Pál Teleki, László Bárdossy and Miklós Kállay cabinets.

After the Nazi occupation of Hungary he was replaced by Béla Jurcsek. In September 1944, Bánffy demanded immediately binding of the truce in the representation of the Transylvanian interests. He died in Budapest, Hungary.

References
 Magyar Életrajzi Lexikon	

1893 births
1955 deaths
People from Aiud
People from the Kingdom of Hungary
Agriculture ministers of Hungary
Daniel